Zaynulla Rasulev Mosque  in Tzarskoe selo district is one of the mosques in the town Uchaly, Bashkortostan, Russia.

It is named after Zaynulla Rasulev

See also 
Islam in Russia
List of mosques in Russia
List of mosques in Europe

References 

2009 establishments in Russia
Mosques completed in 2009
Mosques in Bashkortostan
Mosques in Russia
Mosques in Europe